The Pan-American Championships also known as the Torneo Panamericano de Tenis was a men's and women's clay court tennis tournament established in 1943 and played at the Centro Deportivo Chapultepec, Mexico City, Mexico until 1969.

History
The Pan-American Championships or Torneo Panamericano de Tenis was established in 1943, and played on clay courts at the Centro Deportivo Chapultepec, Mexico City, Mexico. The championships were staged annually until 1969 when they were discontinued.

Finals

Men's Singles
Incomplete roll
Results included:

Women's Singles
Incomplete roll
(two editions of event played January * & October **)

References

Clay court tennis tournaments
Defunct tennis tournaments in Mexico